Mashil Bandar may refer to:
 Mashil Bandar 2